Jurkowo  (formerly Jurkowo Węgorzewskie) is a village in the administrative district of Gmina Kruklanki, within Giżycko County, Warmian-Masurian Voivodeship, in northern Poland.

The village has a population of 170.

References

Jurkowo Wegorzewskie